Spaceship may refer to:

Spaceflight
 Space vehicle, the combination of launch vehicle and spacecraft
 Spacecraft, a craft, vehicle, vessel or machine designed for spaceflight
 Starship, a spacecraft built for interstellar flight

Music

Songs 
 "Spaceship" (Kanye West song)
 "Spaceship" (Puddle of Mudd song)
 "Spaceship" (Tinchy Stryder and Dappy song)
 "Spaceship" (Anhayla song)
 "Spaceship", a song by Benny Benassi from the album Electroman
 "Spaceship", a song by The Vines from the album Vision Valley
 "Spaceship", a song by Angie Aparo

Opera 

 "Spaceship", scene 3 from the fourth act of Einstein on the Beach, composed by Philip Glass

Other uses
 The Creature Wasn't Nice or Spaceship, a 1981 comedy film starring Leslie Nielsen
 Spaceship (cellular automaton), a pattern that, after a number of generations, translates itself along the board
 Spaceship operator, a comparison primitive in several programming languages

See also 

 Spaceships in science fiction
 Ship Space
 Starship (disambiguation) 
 Rocketship (disambiguation) 
 
 
 
 
 
 Ship (disambiguation) 
 Space (disambiguation)